"The Negro Speaks of Rivers" is a poem by American writer Langston Hughes. Hughes wrote the poem when he was 17 and crossing the Mississippi River on the way to visit his father in Mexico. It was first published the following year in The Crisis, starting Hughes's literary career. "The Negro Speaks of Rivers" uses rivers as a metaphor for Hughes's life and the broader African-American experience. It has been reprinted often and is considered one of Hughes's most famous and signature works.

Background 
Langston Hughes was born in 1902, in Missouri. He attended high school in Cleveland, Ohio, where he first began writing. He graduated from Central High School in 1917. Several years after graduating high school, Hughes decided to travel to Mexico City and live with his father, whom he did not know well. He left in 1920.

Composition and publication history

Hughes said that the poem was written in about "ten or fifteen minutes" on "the back of an envelope" he had when he was seventeen and crossing the Mississippi River on the way to visit his father in Mexico. The poem was first published in The Crisis in July 1921, and was later collected into the 1926 The Weary Blues. The poet Jessie Redmon Fauset, who was the literary editor of The Crisis, was responsible for the initial acceptance and publication of "The Negro Speaks of Rivers". Fauset wrote in a review of The Weary Blues upon its publication that after she read the poem, she brought it to W. E. B. Du Bois (the publisher of The Crisis) and said "What colored person is there, do you suppose, in the United States who writes like that and yet is unknown to us?" She found out who Hughes was and the poem was published.

Twenty years after its publication, Hughes suggested the poem be turned into a Hollywood film, but the project never went forward.

Poem
I've known rivers:
I've known rivers ancient as the world and older than the
      flow of human blood in human veins.

My soul has grown deep like the rivers.

I bathed in the Euphrates when dawns were young.
I built my hut near the Congo and it lulled me to sleep.
I looked upon the Nile and raised the pyramids above it.
I heard the singing of the Mississippi when Abe Lincoln
     went down to New Orleans, and I've seen its muddy
     bosom turn all golden in the sunset.

I've known rivers:
Ancient, dusky rivers.

My soul has grown deep like the rivers.

Reception and analysis
"The Negro Speaks of Rivers" is one of Hughes's earliest poems and is considered to mark the beginning of his career as a poet.  Sandra Merriweather in the Encyclopedia of American Poetry considered the poem to be one of Hughes's best works, and it has been described as his "signature" poem. However, it has also been described as one of his "most uncharacteristic poems". The work is one of his most famous poems. The professor Ira Dworkin described the poem as "an iconic representative of Hughes and the Harlem Renaissance." Upon publication, it "delighted black traditionalists", who appreciated the poem's message. Hughes's poems "The Negro Speaks of Rivers", "Mother to Son", and "Harlem" were described in the Encyclopedia of African-American Writing as "anthems of black America".

The poem utilizes a river as a metaphor for Hughes's life and the broader African-American experience. It does not rhyme and uses lines, particularly repetition of "My soul has grown deep like the rivers” to say that, according to the professor Christopher C. De Santis, "experience and history, though often oppressive, have not extinguished but rather emboldened the development of a soul, the birth of an immortal self, the proud 'I' that now speaks to all who will listen." That line also alludes to W. E. B. Du Bois, who wrote The Souls of Black Folk in 1903. Hughes dedicated the whole poem to Du Bois when he republished it in The Weary Blues. The dedication came at the urging of Fauset and was not included in subsequent reprintings. 

Hughes wrote the poem while the Great Migration, a movement of African Americans out of the Southern United States and into Northern cities like Chicago, was ongoing. William Hogan, a scholar, places Hughes's poem in the context of this vast uprooting of population, noting that it "recognizes the need for a new kind of rootedness, one that embraced a history of migration and resettlement. Hogan argues that by connecting "communities of color across both space and time", Hughes is developing "a theory of racial community" which draws strength from migration and change. The "many 'routes' historically taken by black culture only strengthen the 'roots' of the community".

The scholar Allan Burns feels that the poem is written from the perspective of a "'soul' or 'consciousness' of black people in general" rather than Hughes himself. Burns also notes the progression of rivers through the poem from the Euphrates to the Mississippi follows a chronology of history "from the Garden of Eden [. . .] to modern America." By describing the "muddy bosom" of the river turning "golden in the sunset", Hughes provides a note of hope that Burns equates to the phrase per aspera ad astra (through suffering to the stars). Hughes himself had not traveled widely when he wrote the poem.

The scholar W. Jason Miller considers the poem was an anti-lynching work, noting that Hughes lived during an era where he would have been impacted by lynchings, particularly after the Red Summer of 1919, when numerous blacks were attacked and killed by whites. Miller notes that Hughes was probably intimidated as he traveled by himself to visit his father in Mexico, passing through Texas, where numerous lynchings occurred. Miller goes on to argue that Hughes used the poem to provide reassurance "that because others have survived, he and his readers can survive too." Although the poem is titled with a verb in the present tense ("Speaks"), the actual text focuses on the past ("I've"). Miller feels that this shows Hughes defining rivers as "part of a natural realm needing to be reclaimed as a site that African Americans have known and should now know."

In his early writing, including "The Negro Speaks of Rivers", Hughes was inspired by American poet Carl Sandburg. Rachel Blau DuPlessis argues that part of the poem reinterprets Vachel Lindsay's "The Congo", by portraying the Congo River as "a pastoral nourishing, maternal setting." Hughes references the spiritual "Deep River" in the line "My soul has grown deep like the rivers." The poem was also influenced by Walt Whitman.

Impact and legacy 

The poem has been cited as becoming "the voice of the Association [NAACP] itself," along with "Song of the Son" by Jean Toomer and editorials that Du Bois wrote. One of Hughes's most reprinted works, the poem had been reprinted at least 11 times within a decade of its first publication, including in the 1925 anthology The New Negro, the 1927 work Caroling Dusk, and Hughes's own The Dream Keeper in 1932. 

After Hughes died on May 22, 1967, his ashes were interred in the Schomburg Center for Research in Black Culture in Harlem under a cosmogram that was inspired by "The Negro Speaks of Rivers". The cosmogram is entitled Rivers and was designed by Houston Conwill. In the center of the cosmogram is the line: "My soul has grown deep like the rivers".

Pearl Primus, a dance choreographer, developed a work based on the poem.

References

External links

 The Big Sea: An Autobiography 'The Negro Speaks of Rivers and its writing], from Langston Hughes, The Big Sea: An Autobiography''
 The Negro Speaks of Rivers, as printed in The Crisis 60th Anniversary Issue, Nov 1970.
On "The Negro Speaks of Rivers" at Modern American Poetry

1921 poems
African-American poetry
American poems
Poetry by Langston Hughes
Works originally published in American magazines
Works originally published in political magazines